The state anthem of the Republic of Adygea is one of the national symbols of the Republic of Adygea, a federal subject of Russia, along with its flag and coat of arms. The lyrics were written by Iskhak Mashbash, and the music was composed by Umar Tkhabisimov. The anthem was approved by decision of the Supreme Council of Adygea on 25 March 1992. This was one of the first decisions made by the republic's parliament after the dissolution of the Soviet Union.

Lyrics

Notes

References

External links 
Anthem of the Republic of Adygea (Adyghe vocal)
Anthem of the Republic of Adygea (Russian vocal)
Anthem of the Republic of Adygeya (music only)

Regional songs
Culture of Adygea
Russian anthems